Jul i Kapernaum ("Christmas in Capernaum") was the Sveriges Television's Christmas calendar in 1995.

Plot 
The show is a fantasy-musical set in the small town of Kapernaum.

Video 
The series was released to VHS in 1997. and to DVD on 27 October 2006.

References

External links 
 
 

1995 Swedish television series debuts
1995 Swedish television series endings
Sveriges Television's Christmas calendar
Swedish television shows featuring puppetry